Million Dollar Baby is a 1941 American romantic comedy film directed by Curtis Bernhardt. Released by Warner Bros., the film stars Priscilla Lane, Jeffrey Lynn, and Ronald Reagan, with May Robson and Lee Patrick.

Plot
When wealthy American expatriate Cornelia Wheelwright (Robson) is informed by her longtime lawyers that her late father swindled his partner, Fortune McCallister, out of $700,000, she acts decisively. First, because James Amory is the only lawyer in the firm to be outraged by the injustice, she hires him and fires the rest of the firm. His first task is to locate all of McCallister's heirs. It turns out there is only one: granddaughter Pam McCallister (Lane).

Pam works in Lacey's Department Store and lives in a boardinghouse in New York City. To find out what kind of person she is, Cornelia becomes a fellow tenant. Cornelia also meets Pam's boyfriend, composer and piano player Pete Rowan (Reagan).

Cornelia then has Jim give Pam a million dollars. Pam is excited at first, buying gifts for her boardinghouse friends, and her boyfriend, who lives across the hall from her.  Much to her surprise, her friends and boyfriend seem to change overnight.  They are not as overjoyed at her good fortune as she imagines they would be, and rather resent her.  As the last straw, her boyfriend tells her she's an Elsie Dinsmore and breaks it off with her. Pam finally decides on a course of action that makes her happy, as well as those around her.

Cast
Priscilla Lane as Pamela "Pam" McAllister
Jeffrey Lynn as James "Jim/Jimmy" Amory
Ronald Reagan as Peter "Pete" Rowan
May Robson as Cornelia Wheelwright, aka Miss White
Lee Patrick as Josie "Lou" La Rue
Helen Westley as Mrs. Galloway, the landlady
George Barbier as  Mr. Marlin
Nan Wynn as Flo Turner
John Qualen as Dr. Patterson
Walter Catlett s Mr. Simpson, Lacey's Dept. Store floorwalker
Fay Helm as Mrs. Grayson
Richard Carle as George
John Ridgely as Ollie Ward
Maris Wrixon as Diana Bennet
James Burke as Callahan, Lacey's Dept. Store detective
Charles Halton as John Parkinson
John Sheffield as Alvie Grayson
Jack Mower as Charlie

External links
 
 

1941 romantic comedy films
American romantic comedy films
American black-and-white films
Films scored by Friedrich Hollaender
Films set in New York City
Warner Bros. films
1941 films
Films directed by Curtis Bernhardt
1940s English-language films
1940s American films